Łosie or Losie may refer to the following places:
Łosie, Gorlice County, Lesser Poland Voivodeship, south Poland
Łosie, Nowy Sącz County, Lesser Poland Voivodeship, south Poland
Łosie, Masovian Voivodeship, east-central Poland
Łosie-Dołęgi, Podlaskie Voivodeship, north-eastern Poland
Losie, West Virginia, a ghost town in the United States

See also
 Losi (disambiguation)
 Losee (disambiguation)